WSQX-FM is an NPR member radio station in south-central New York State. It operates in Binghamton, New York, on 91.5 MHz (FM), and has an effective radiated power of 3.5 kW. The signal is repeated in Greene by WSQN 88.1 MHz, in Corning by translator station W214AA on 90.7 MHz, and in Cooperstown by translator station W290CI on 105.9 MHz.

WSQX-FM began broadcast at the beginning of 1995. The station had long aired an expanded schedule of NPR news programming, along with jazz music. However, on February 3, 2019, it switched to a mix of classical music during the week and jazz and folk music on weekends, consolidating all NPR news programming on sister station WSKG-FM.

WSKG-TV and WSKG-FM are other broadcast stations owned and operated by the WSKG Public Telecommunications Council.

Simulcast

Translators

See also
 WIOX
 WSKG-FM

External links
WSQX official website

Other station data

NPR member stations
SQX-FM
Public radio stations in the United States
Radio stations established in 1995
1995 establishments in New York (state)